SKF-82,958 is a synthetic compound of the benzazepine class that acts as a D1/D5 receptor full agonist. SKF-82,958 and similar D1-like-selective full agonists like SKF-81,297 and 6-Br-APB produce characteristic anorectic effects, hyperactivity and self-administration in animals, with a similar but not identical profile to that of dopaminergic stimulants such as amphetamine. SKF-82,958 was also subsequently found to act as an agonist of ERα with negligible activity at ERβ, making it a subtype-selective estrogen.

References

1-Phenyl-2,3,4,5-tetrahydro-1H-3-benzazepines
Synthetic estrogens
GSK plc brands
D1-receptor agonists
D5 receptor agonists
Phenols
Chloroarenes
Allyl compounds